The Aller Brook is a stream that flows for  through Devon, England. It is a primary tributary of the River Teign, which it joins near Newton Abbot.

Course
The brook rises to the south of Daccombe, near Coffinswell, and initially flows due west, until it reaches the village of Kingskerswell, where it turns north to flow through the Aller vale. It is joined by a stream on the left which drains Abbotskerswell and Compton. The brook continues north, passing to the west of Milber, before it reaches Newton Abbot. Originally the brook took a meandering course through this marshy area, but in the 1980s it was forced to run alongside the A380 road in a straight channel. The area is now a local nature reserve, situated between the town and the Buckland estate. At the end of the reserve the brook enters the Teign Estuary at the Templer Way footbridge.

Ecology

The brook has been classed as having both good ecological and chemical quality under the Water Framework Directive. This is in the upper band in the five-part framework scale, which ranges from high, good, and moderate, through to poor and finally bad.

Wildlife including dragonflies, kingfishers and otters have been identified within the nature reserve. There is also a notable cluster of Bee Orchids (Ophrys apifera) within the reserve.

The recent construction of the Kingskerswell bypass along the Aller valley, required various environmental measures to be included due to the local wildlife. This included the construction of a specially designed tunnel for otters, which will help them navigate beneath the new carriageway when their normal routes, such as culverts are flooded and inaccessible due to high brook levels.

References

External links

Aller Brook water levels at Kingskerswell

Tributaries of the Teign
Rivers of Devon
Local Nature Reserves in Devon
1Aller